Shane Neilson (born 1975) is a Canadian physician, author and poet.

Life
Neilson was born in New Brunswick, Canada and trained in Dalhousie University Faculty of Medicine, followed by Memorial University of Newfoundland. He currently has a medical practice in Erin, and lives with his family in Guelph, Ontario.

Neilson has written two non fiction books about his experience as a physician Call Me Doctor and Gunmetal Blue.

Poetry
His books of poetry include Complete Physical, Meniscus and Exterminate My Heart. In 2010, Neilson won Arc Poetry Magazine'''s 15th annual Poem of the Year contest.

In addition to being an author, Neilson is a notable critic and the poetry editor for Frog Hollow Press, and in 2005 he was editor for a collection of Alden Nowlan's medical poems called Alden Nowlan and Illness.

Bibliography

Shane Neilson (2014) "Able Physiologists Discuss Grief Musculatures." Jack Pine Press.
Shane Neilson (2015) On Shaving Off His Face. The Porcupine's Quill.
Shane Neilson (2018) Dysphoria. The Porcupine's Quill.
Shane Neilson (2019) New Brunswick. Biblioasis.
Shane Neilson (2019) Margin of Interest: Essays on English Language Poetry of the Maritimes.'' The Porcupine's Quill.

References 

20th-century Canadian poets
Canadian male poets
Canadian general practitioners
1975 births
Living people
20th-century Canadian male writers